Tim Borowski (born 2 May 1980) is a German football manager and former player.

A midfielder, Borowski spent 11 years of his 12-year professional career with Werder Bremen, amassing Bundesliga totals of 236 games and 32 goals and winning three major titles, including the 2004 national championship. He played 33 times and scored twice for the Germany national team from 2002 to 2008, representing Germany at the 2006 World Cup and Euro 2008.

Club career

Werder Bremen
Born in Neubrandenburg, Bezirk Neubrandenburg, East Germany, Borowski started his career at hometown club 1. FC Neubrandenburg 04, where he was spotted by SV Werder Bremen and signed at the age of 16 for its junior teams. He spent two full seasons with the reserves, competing mainly in Regionalliga Nord.

Borowski made his official debut for Werder on 26 August 2000, starting in a 0–1 home loss against VfL Wolfsburg for the DFB-Pokal. He was definitely promoted to the main squad early into the following campaign.

Borowski contributed with 25 games and one goal (against FC Schalke 04 in a 4–1 home win) in 2003–04 as the Hanseatic won their fourth national championship, the first in 11 years. He added career highs of ten goals and 11 assists in the 2005–06 season, helping his team to a final second position; in the latter campaign's UEFA Champions League he also scored against Juventus F.C. for a 3–2 round-of-16 first leg home win, in an eventual away goals rule exit.

Bayern Munich
Borowski joined FC Bayern Munich in the 2008 summer after the move was made effective in January, in a free transfer. He finished his first and only season with 30 appearances all competitions comprised. In this season, he appeared in the Champions League seven times and scored there once, he scored in the DFB-Pokal too, and in the Bundesliga five times. In the Bundesliga, he managed to establish himself in the starting eleven six times, in the DFB-Pokal twice, and in the Champions League also twice.

Return to Werder
Borowski returned to Werder Bremen on 22 July 2009, signing a three-year contract. After featuring in only 13 league matches in his last two years combined he was released by his main club, and retired from football shortly after due to injury, aged 32.

In the summer of 2014, Borowski completed his 18-month traineeship in the marketing department which he had been going through since January 2013 at Werder Bremen. In April of the following year, he signed a contract until July 2018 as sports director for the reserve team.

International career
Borowski gained his first cap for Germany on 21 August 2002, appearing as a late substitute in a 2–2 friendly draw with Bulgaria in Sofia. He was selected by manager Jürgen Klinsmann for the 2006 FIFA World Cup on home soil, filling in for captain Michael Ballack in the opener against Costa Rica (4–2 triumph).

Borowski then proceeded to collect a further four substitute appearances: in the quarter-final against Argentina he made a superb assist for Bremen teammate Miroslav Klose to score the equalizing goal for Germany, and also converted his penalty shootout attempt as it ended 4–2 for the hosts. He started in the following match against Italy, leaving injured in an eventual 0–2 loss.

Borowski also participated at the 2005 FIFA Confederations Cup (three minutes against Brazil in the semi-finals) and UEFA Euro 2008 (two substitute appearances for the runners-up).

Post-playing career
Next to manager Florian Kohfeldt, Borowski became part of the coaching team in 2017. Prior to this, he assisted at one of the club's youth level teams (U17). He worked to acquire the fourth and final DFB manager license in 2020.

Career statistics

Club

International

Scores and results list Germany's goal tally first, score column indicates score after each Borowski goal.

Honours
Werder Bremen
Bundesliga: 2003–04
DFB-Pokal: 2003–04; runner-up: 2009–10
DFB-Ligapokal: 2006; runner-up: 2004

Germany
UEFA European Championship runner-up: 2008
FIFA World Cup third place: 2006
FIFA Confederations Cup third place: 2005

References

External links

 

1980 births
Living people
People from Neubrandenburg
Footballers from Mecklenburg-Western Pomerania
German footballers
Association football midfielders
Bundesliga players
SV Werder Bremen II players
SV Werder Bremen players
FC Bayern Munich footballers
Germany under-21 international footballers
Germany B international footballers
Germany international footballers
2005 FIFA Confederations Cup players
2006 FIFA World Cup players
UEFA Euro 2008 players
SV Werder Bremen non-playing staff